Eryx may refer to:
 Eryx (Sicily), an ancient city in Sicily, the modern Erice, Italy
 Mount Eryx, upon which the city stood, the modern Mount Erice
 Eryx (mythology), a mythological king of the Sicilian city of Eryx, and boxer killed by Heracles
 Eryx (missile), an anti-tank missile
 Eryx (snake), a genus of snakes
 "In the Walls of Eryx", a short story by H. P. Lovecraft and K. J. Sterling